Classics Volume Two, also stylised as Classics, Vol. 2, is the eighth public album by the group Two Steps From Hell, released in June 2015. It features 15 previously unreleased tracks from prior demonstration albums composed by Thomas J. Bergersen, and 10 entirely new tracks from Nick Phoenix (the latter all later released on their industry album, Empire). The album features tracks containing vocal performances by Felicia Farerre and Aya Peard.

Track listing

Charts

References

External links

2015 albums
Two Steps from Hell albums